Natriuretic peptide receptor A/guanylate cyclase A (atrionatriuretic peptide receptor A), also known as NPR1, is an atrial natriuretic peptide receptor. In humans it is encoded by the NPR1 gene.

Function 

NPR1 is a membrane-bound guanylate cyclase that serves as the receptor for both atrial and brain natriuretic peptides (ANP and BNP, respectively).

It is localized in the kidney where it results in natriuresis upon binding to natriuretic peptides. However, it is found in even greater quantity in the lungs and adipocytes.

See also
 Atrial natriuretic peptide receptor

References

Further reading

External links
 

EC 4.6.1